Soldeu is a village and ski resort in Andorra in the Pyrenees mountains, located in the parish of Canillo.

Overview

According to The Sunday Times, Soldeu is one of the three best budget skiing resorts in Europe. The ski area links to Encamp, Canillo, El Tarter, Grau Roig and Pas de la Casa. The Soldeu Ski School has a large number of native English speaking instructors and has won awards for the quality of its tuition.

From there, it is possible to ski to the top of the El Tarter gondola or the village of El Tarter itself via the blue-rated 'gall de bosc' run.

The village has various hotels, bars, restaurants, as well as ski and snowboard shops. It is more family orientated than neighbouring Pas de la Casa. The native language is Catalan. English is spoken in many shops and restaurants.

World Cup racing
Soldeu hosted World Cup alpine events for the first time in February 2012. Three women's races were scheduled, two giant slaloms and a slalom. The additional GS was due to a cancellation at Courchevel in mid-December, but was also cancelled at Soldeu due to extremely high winds on Friday.  Women's races were hosted again in 2016: a super-G and a combined in late February.

The World Cup finals (nine events) of 2019 were held Soldeu in mid-March. These finals will be repeated in March 2023. There is also a possibility to host Alpine skiing at the Winter Olympics with other events in nearby European countries in 2030 or later.

References

External links

 Official website of Grandvalira - Soldeu, Andorra

Populated places in Andorra
Canillo
Ski areas and resorts in Andorra
Pyrenees